Adam Zero is a ballet with music composed by Arthur Bliss and choreographed by Robert Helpmann in 1946.

Background
After World War I, Bliss developed an interest in ballet after seeing the Ballets Russes of Sergei Diaghilev in London. Bliss composed Adam Zero for the Sadler's Wells Ballet, in collaboration with Michael Benthall and Robert Helpmann, with whom he had seen success with Miracle in the Gorbals. The first performance at the Royal Opera House, Covent Garden in London on 6 April 1946 was conducted by Constant Lambert.  The premiere dancers included the following:
 David Paltenghi (The Stage Director)
 June Brae (The Choreographer / The Ballerina)
 Robert Helpmann (Adam Zero)
 Jean Bedells (The Designer)
 Julia Farron (The Wardrobe Mistress)
 Gillian Lynne (The Daughter)
 Palma Nye (The Dresser)
 Leslie Edwards (The Mime)
 Gordon Hamilton (The Dog)

Bliss considered Adam Zero his "most varied and exciting ballet score; the music is instinctively theatrical and strongly characterized." The orchestra is augmented by cor anglais, saxophone, tuba, two standard percussionists and two dance band percussionists, plus celesta and harp.

It was revived as a ballet with choreography by Sergei Vanaev and conducted by Marc Niemann at the Stadttheater Bremerhaven in 2016.

Sections
 Fanfare Overture: Allegro Molto
 The Stage: Andante sostenuto 
 Birth of Adam: Molto sostenuto
 Adam’s Fates: Allegro moderato
 Dance of Spring: Allegro spirito
 Awakening of Love: Andante grazioso
 Bridal Ceremony: Moderato ma tranquillo
 Adam Achieves Power: Allegro spiritoso
 Re-entry of Adam’s Fates: Allegro moderato
 Dance of Summer: Allegro maestoso
 Approach of Autumn: Larghetto
 Night Club Scene: Moderato
 Destruction of Adam’s World: Allegro molto
 Approach of Winter: Andantino
 Dance with Death: Largo maestoso
 Finale – the stage is reset for the next life-cycle: Allegro moderato

The complete ballet runs for around 40 minutes.

Synopsis
The ballet is an allegory of the cycle of man’s life; the world in which he lives is represented by a stage on which a ballet is being created: Adam is cast as the principal dancer, Omnipotence is represented by the Stage Director and Adam’s Fates by the Designer, Wardrobe Mistress and Dresser.

Adam falls in love, marries, and achieves power, but his triumph is brief; his world crumbles about him, he is stripped of his glory, and a new generation (Understudy) takes his place. He seeks distraction in dissipation but everyone deserts him and he is left alone to face Death.

Recordings
 Naxos 8.553460: English Northern Philharmonia; David Lloyd-Jones, conductor (complete ballet). 1995.

References

Ballets by Robert Helpmann
Ballets by Arthur Bliss
1946 ballet premieres